Lillian or Lilian can refer to:

People and fictional characters 
 Lillian (given name) or Lilian, including a list of people and fictional characters with the given name
 Isidore Lillian (1882-1960), American Yiddish theatre playwright and lyricist

Places

Iran 
 Lilian, Iran, a village in Markazi Province

United States 
 Lillian, Alabama
 Lillian, West Virginia
 Lillian Township, Custer County, Nebraska

Arts and entertainment 
 Lillian (album), a 2005 collaboration between Alias (Brendan Whitney) and his brother Ehren Whitney
 "John the Revelator / Lilian", a 2006 single by Depeche Mode
 Lillian (film), a 2019 film

Ships 
 USS Lillian II (SP-38), a United States Navy patrol boat in commission in 1917
 USS Lilian (1863), a United States Navy steamer in commission from 1864 to 1865

Other uses 
 Hurricane Lillian, two tropical cyclones

See also
 Lake Lillian (disambiguation)